The Saskatchewan Jazz Festival (branded as the SaskTel Saskatchewan Jazz Festival for sponsorship reasons) is an annual outdoor music festival held in Saskatoon, Saskatchewan. Established in 1987, it has largely been held at the gardens of the Delta Bessborough hotel in Saskatoon, and features performers representing many genres—but particularly jazz, blues, and folk.

Concerts
The event features live performances from various locations in downtown Saskatoon; two of the festival's main locations have been the Delta Bessborough hotel (which hosts the ticketed "TD Mainstage" events), and Victoria Park along the South Saskatchewan River, which hosts events that are free to attend. Other festival venues have included the Broadway Theatre.

Awards
The Special Recognition Award is awarded for making significant contributions to Jazz of Saskatchewan or Canada. Since 1989 musicians, educators, or supporters have received this award.

History

The first sponsor of the Jazz festival was du Maurier Ltd, and the festival was only held in Saskatoon for a short run of only 5 days. Saskatoon, Regina, Moose Jaw, North Battleford, and Prince Albert are various venues which include performances.  2003 there was also performances held in Lloydminster.  2006 saw the 20th anniversary of the Saskatchewan Jazz Festival and was recorded as the second largest jazz festival of Western Canada with attendance of over 40000.

The 2020 festival was cancelled due to the COVID-19 pandemic. The event returned for 2021, although downsized with only Canadian talent due to travel restrictions. In 2022, the festival moved its free programming to Saskatoon's downtown Victoria Park, including Canada Day festivities headlined by country musician Tenille Arts. In 2023, citing economic conditions and a pivot to provide a streamlined event with more free programming, it was announced that the events held at Bessborough would be moved to Victoria Park.

References

External links
 SaskTel Saskatchewan Jazz Festival
 The 21st Annual SaskTel Saskatchewan Jazz Festival First Shows Go ...
 News Release – Canada's New Government Supports Saskatchewan Jazz ...
 Spirit of Vancouver – October 30, 2003 – TD Canada Trust Announces ...

Festivals in Saskatoon
Jazz festivals in Canada
Music festivals in Saskatchewan
Summer festivals
Recurring events established in 1992